The weightlifting competitions at the 2017 Southeast Asian Games in Kuala Lumpur will take place at Kuala Lumpur Convention Centre.

Events
5 sets of medals were awarded in the following events:

Medalists

Men

Medal table

See also
Powerlifting at the 2017 ASEAN Para Games

References

External links
  

Weightlifting at the Southeast Asian Games
2017 Southeast Asian Games events